Zygopini is a tribe of twig and stem weevils in the beetle family Curculionidae. There are more than 20 genera and at least 250 described species in Zygopini. 83 species are currently known from the 11 genera occurring north of South America, 8 genera occur exclusively in South America, and 2 are recorded from Africa.

Genera
These 22 genera belong to the tribe Zygopini:

 Acopturus Heller, 1895
 Arachnomorpha Champion, 1906
 Archocopturus Heller, 1895
 Colpothorax Desbrochers, 1890
 Copturosomus Heller, 1895
 Cylindrocopturus Heller, 1895
 †Geratozygops Davis and Engel, 2006
 Helleriella Champion, 1906
 Hemicolpus Heller, 1895
 Hypoplagius Desbrochers, 1891
 Isocopturus Hustache, 1931
 Larides Champion, 1906
 Lissoderes Champion, 1906
 Macrotimorus Heller, 1895
 Parazygops Desbrochers, 1890
 Peltophorus Schoenherr, 1845
 Phileas Champion, 1906
 Philenis Champion, 1906
 Timorus Schoenherr, 1838
 Xeniella Hustache, 1931
 Zygops Schoenherr, 1825
 Zygopsella Champion, 1906

References

Further reading

 
 
 
 

Weevils